Brian Leonel Blando (born 1 April 1995) is an Argentine professional footballer who plays as a forward for Lanús.

Career
Blando began his career in Rosario Central's youth system, leaving in February 2016 to join Agropecuario of Torneo Federal B. He scored two goals in seventeen fixtures in 2016 as Agropecuario were promoted to Torneo Federal A; which was followed by a second consecutive promotion to Primera B Nacional. Blando's professional debut arrived on 24 September 2017 versus Flandria, which preceded his first pro goal in November during a 2–1 defeat to Deportivo Morón.

On 11 July 2022, Blando joined Argentine Primera División side Lanús on a deal until the end of 2025.

Career statistics
.

Honours
Agropecuario
 Torneo Federal A: 2016–17

References

External links

1995 births
Living people
Argentine footballers
Footballers from Rosario, Santa Fe
Association football forwards
Torneo Federal A players
Primera Nacional players
Primera Divisió players
Club Agropecuario Argentino players
Club Atlético Lanús footballers